MassCourts is the case management system used in the Massachusetts court system.

It does not allow documents to be viewed online, and the courts have deliberately blocked public access to basic information for most cases (particularly, criminal cases in District Court and all cases in Superior Court). In June 2015, court judges heard consultation on a proposed revision to the policy that aims to make civil cases in Superior Court publicly accessible. Many journalists argued for a more open framework but critics of the proposal suggested that case filings containing libellous descriptions of witnesses could be used to discriminate against individuals.

See also 
 CM/ECF
 New York State Courts Electronic Filing System
 California Court Case Management System
 PACER

References

External links 
 MassCourts detailed instructions 

Massachusetts state courts
Government databases in the United States
Online law databases